Old Hose House No. 4, also known as Whiting Sheet Metal, was a historic fire station located in downtown Evansville, Indiana.  It was built in 1860. It has been demolished.

It was listed on the National Register of Historic Places in 1982 and delisted in 2011.

References

Former National Register of Historic Places in Indiana
Fire stations on the National Register of Historic Places in Indiana
Government buildings completed in 1860
Buildings and structures in Evansville, Indiana
National Register of Historic Places in Evansville, Indiana